The Imperial Mosque also known as King's Mosque (Carska džamija u Prištini) is an Ottoman mosque located in Pristina, Kosovo. It was built in 1461 by Sultan Mehmed II. 

The mosque was declared a Monument of Culture of Exceptional Importance in 1990 by the Republic of Serbia.

History
During the Austro-Turkish wars, at the end of the 17th century, it was temporarily turned into a Catholic church. One of the most prominent Albanian writers, Pjetër Bogdani, also an active leader of the pro-Austrian rebels, was buried here. After the Ottomans regained control, in 1690, the bones of Pjetër Bogdani were exhumed and thrown into the street by the Ottoman soldiers.

Gallery

See also
 Great Hamam of Pristina
 Religion in Kosovo
 Islam in Kosovo
 Tourism in Kosovo
 Cultural monuments of the Kosovo district

Notes

References

Buildings of Mehmed the Conqueror
Religious buildings and structures completed in 1461
1461 establishments in the Ottoman Empire
15th-century mosques
Ottoman mosques in Kosovo
Religious buildings and structures in Pristina
Cultural Monuments of Exceptional Importance (Serbia)